The Tenth Amendment to the Constitution of Pakistan (Urdu: آئین پاکستان میں دسویں ترمیم) was enacted on March 29, 1987. It amended the article 54 and 61 of the Constitution by changing the duration of interval period between sessions of the National Assembly & Senate from 160 days to 130 days.

Text

See also
 Zia-ul-Haq's Islamization
 Separation of powers
 Nawaz Sharif
 Benazir Bhutto
 Pervez Musharraf

External links
 Full-text of the Tenth Amendment

References

01